David Lawrence McKay (born March 14, 1950) is a Canadian former Major League Baseball player and a longtime coach at the MLB level, currently the first base coach for the Arizona Diamondbacks of Major League Baseball (MLB). As an active player, he was an infielder for the Minnesota Twins, Toronto Blue Jays and the Oakland Athletics. He is the father of former catcher Cody McKay.

He is a member of the Canadian Baseball Hall of Fame, elected in the Class of 2001.
He was inducted into the Columbia Basin College Hall of Fame in January 2012.

Playing career

Minnesota Twins (1975–76)
McKay signed as an amateur free agent with the Minnesota Twins on June 20, 1971, and worked his way through the Twins minor league organization, making his Major League debut on August 22, 1975, hitting a home run in his first at-bat against Vern Ruhle of the Detroit Tigers in an 8–4 victory. McKay appeared in 35 games with the Twins, hitting .256 with two home runs and 16 runs batted in.

He spent the majority of the 1976 season in the minor leagues, though did appear in 45 games with Minnesota, batting .203 with no homers and eight RBI. On November 5, the Twins left McKay unprotected at the 1976 MLB expansion draft where he was selected by the Toronto Blue Jays.

Toronto Blue Jays (1977–79)
McKay was the Blue Jays starting third baseman for their first game on April 7, as the Canadian-born player had two hits in Toronto's 9–5 victory over the Chicago White Sox at Exhibition Stadium in Toronto. In 95 games with the Blue Jays, McKay hit .197 with three home runs and 22 RBI, splitting time between second base, third base and shortstop.

McKay became the Blue Jays starting second baseman in 1978, playing in a career high 145 games, batting .238 with seven homers and 45 RBI. He finished sixth in the American League with six triples, and fifth with a .984 fielding percentage at second base.

He struggled in 1979, losing his starting job and spending time with the Blue Jays' Triple-A affiliate, the Syracuse Chiefs, for a majority of the season. With Toronto, McKay hit .218 with 0 HR and 12 RBI in 47 games. On November 5, the Blue Jays released McKay.

Oakland Athletics (1980–82)
McKay signed with the Oakland Athletics on April 4, 1980, and in 129 games with the Athletics, McKay hit .244 with one homer and 29 RBI as a utility infielder.

He improved offensively in 1981, hitting .263 with four home runs and 21 RBI in 79 games, helping Oakland reach the playoffs. In the 1981 American League Divisional Series, McKay hit .273 with a home run and an RBI as the Athletics defeated the Kansas City Royals to advance to the American League Championship Series. In the ALCS, McKay again hit .273, with an RBI, as Oakland lost to the New York Yankees.

McKay struggled during the 1982 season, hitting only .198 with four home runs and 17 RBI in 78 games.

He spent the 1983 season with Oakland's A and AAA teams before retiring as a player; he joined the Oakland coaching staff under manager Jackie Moore the following season.

McKay appeared in 645 games during his career, recording 441 hits and had a .229 batting average with 21 home runs and 170 RBI. In six career playoff games, McKay hit .273 with one home run and two RBI.

Coaching career

The 2020 season marked McKay's 36th consecutive campaign as a Major League coach, and his fourth with the Diamondbacks. The previous three decades were spent with three teams: the Athletics (1984–1995), St. Louis Cardinals (1996–2011) and Chicago Cubs (2012–2013). Although almost every year of his coaching career (including his current post) has been spent as a first-base coach, he spent 1988 as the strength and conditioning coach of the A's. He and José Canseco co-authored a book on proper weight training techniques for baseball players.

McKay began a long-term professional association with both manager Tony La Russa and pitching coach Dave Duncan from the midpoint of the 1986, when LaRussa and Duncan took over their respective positions with Oakland, through 2011 with the Cardinals. The three were on staff for six pennant-winning and three world championship teams—the 1989 Athletics and the 2006 and 2011 Cardinals.

A close friend of LaRussa's, McKay had intended to retire from baseball when LaRussa did. When LaRussa announced his retirement in 2011, McKay realized he was not ready. He was offered the opportunity to remain with the Cardinals in another capacity, and did not blame the organization for not welcoming him back to his former job as first base coach, as the Cardinals' front office was under the impression he planned on retiring with LaRussa.

He joined the Cubs for the 2012 season. After two years with the Cubs, working under Dale Sveum, McKay was named to the Diamondbacks' 2014 coaching staff by manager Kirk Gibson, replacing Steve Sax. McKay is responsible for coaching the team's outfielders as well as for his work at first base.

During a spring training game on March 8, 2021, against the San Francisco Giants, McKay fell against a metal railing in the dugout, breaking a rib and lacerating his spleen.

See also

 List of St. Louis Cardinals coaches

References

External links

Dave McKay at Pura Pelota (Venezuelan Professional Baseball League)

1950 births
Living people
Arizona Diamondbacks coaches
Baseball people from British Columbia
Canadian Baseball Hall of Fame inductees
Canadian expatriate baseball players in the United States
Cardenales de Lara players
Canadian expatriate baseball players in Venezuela
Chicago Cubs coaches
Creighton Bluejays baseball players
Lynchburg Twins players
Major League Baseball first base coaches
Major League Baseball players from Canada
Major League Baseball second basemen
Major League Baseball third basemen
Minnesota Twins players
Modesto A's players
Oakland Athletics coaches
Oakland Athletics players
Orlando Twins players
Sportspeople from Vancouver
St. Louis Cardinals coaches
Syracuse Chiefs players
Tacoma Tigers players
Tacoma Twins players
Toronto Blue Jays players
Wisconsin Rapids Twins players
Columbia Basin Hawks baseball players